is a 1992 Japanese film directed by Yoshimitsu Morita. It is based on a semi-autobiographical Seinen manga by Fujiko F. Fujio.

Awards and nominations
17th Hochi Film Award 
 Won: Best Actress - Misa Shimizu

References

1992 films
Films directed by Yoshimitsu Morita
1990s Japanese-language films
1990s Japanese films